The Brihan Maharashtra Sugar Syndicate Ltd. is an Indian sugar company headquartered in Pune, Maharashtra, India. Established in 1934, it is one of the oldest companies in India.

History

Under Chandrashekhar Agashe: 1934 — 1956 
In 1933, the Governor of Bombay, The Lord Brabourne promoted the production of indigenous sugar, having had increased the import tax on the commodity shipping in from Mauritius. This enabled Chandrashekhar Agashe to found the Brihan Maharashtra Sugar Syndicate Ltd. on 21 September 1934, as a limited liability company after two years of crowd-funding campaigns, with funds collected from amongst the Maharashtrian middle classes. The syndicate was headquartered in Pune.

Between 1934 and 1936, Agashe envisioned opening a factory branch of the Syndicate in his hometown of Bhor, and began cultivating 2,000 acres of land for the plantation of sugar cane. In 1935, he began employing tenanted farmers of the local gentry and independent farmers as producers or transportation workers of the sugar cane for the syndicate in the village of Bhorgaon. By 1936, he had licensed or purchase 12,000 acres of farm land to support the syndicate, being lauded for reviving the local economy and consequently receiving further land grants from bankers in Akluj and several politicians in the Bhor State.

After Agashe established the syndicate's headquarters at the Commonwealth Building on Laxmi Road, the Mahratta Chamber of Commerce, Industries and Agriculture declared the sale of 300,000 shares of the syndicate, with the first share going at Rs. 25 in January 1935. Between 1935 and 1937, Agashe toured several states and jagirs within the Deccan States Agency, promoting the syndicate at several village gram panchayats.

In November 1937, Agashe ordered sugar cane processing machinery from Škoda Works in Czechoslovakia before the outbreak of World War II. Following Adolf Hitler's rise to power and the German occupation of Czechoslovakia, Agashe considered retracting his order, but received the ordered machinery before the Reichswerke Hermann Göring took over Škoda. He began construction for the first factory in April 1938, and finally established the syndicate's first sugar cane processing factory in the village of Bhorgaon in March 1939, further purchasing an estate and the surrounding lands as a means to look after his own sugar plantations, with the syndicate's principal factory soon producing 150,000 sacs of sugar per annum by 1940, selling the sugar under the trademark Shree, with the village panchayat renaming the town Shreepur. In 1943, Agashe's donation to the Deccan Education Society led to the establishment of the Brihan Maharashtra College of Commerce in Pune, named after the syndicate.

After Indian independence in 1947, Agashe was able to expand the syndicate's production to 1000 tonnes of sugar cane processed per annum by 1950. By 1953, there was strong opposition to Agashe's role as the managing director of the syndicate from his critics, with the syndicate involved in several allegations of duping shareholders and depositors in the early 1950s. Agashe, in response, published a 400-page report criticizing his detractors of corruption and factionalism based on evidence that his critics were backed by his competitor Karamshi Jethabhai Somaiya, who had previously shown interest in purchasing the syndicate.

Agashe died in June 1956. He was survived in business by his sons Panditrao Agashe and Dnyaneshwar Agashe.

Under S. L. Limaye, K. V. Champhekar and G. S. Valimbe: 1956 — 1970 
Agashe left the syndicate in a strong position. With a decentralised management, S. L. Limaye took over as chairman of the board of directors of the company, serving from 1957 till 1990, while K. V. Champhekar took over as managing director of the company from 1957 to 1962, followed by G. S. Valimbe from 1963 to 1969, until Agashe's sons Panditrao and Dnyaneshwar became joint managing directors in July 1970.

The several senior managers of the company aided Panditrao Agashe, given his considerable youth when he joined the board of directors in 1957. By 1958, the syndicate also maintained a permanent office in Solapur and Shreepur, Maharashtra, with the syndicate celebrating its silver jubilee in 1959. Between 1958 and 1966, the syndicate financially aided several farming communities around the Malshiras taluka, including those regions affected by the Panshet dam flood in 1961. 

The later half of the 1960s saw the syndicate battle the Government of Maharashtra's socialist land acquisition schemes, which they ultimately lost, relinquishing several thousand acres of syndicate owned land to the Government of India. In 1964, the syndicate had employment disputes regarding the reduction of staff in its civil engineering department. By 1966, Panditrao's brother Dnyaneshwar Agashe joined him on the board of directors of the syndicate, with both the brothers becoming joint managing directors in July 1970.

Under Panditrao Agashe and Dnyaneshwar Agashe: 1970 — 2009 
Beginning in the 1970s, under Panditrao and Dnyaneshwar Agashe, the syndicate manufactured liquor in Shreepur, Maharashtra, specialising in whisky production under its several flagship brands. The syndicate was one of the first companies to produce a range of government-approved liquors after the Maharashtra state prohibition, called Indian Made Foreign Liquor. In 1978, Panditrao retired as joint managing director leaving Dnyaneshwar as the sole managing director. By the early 1980s, the syndicate also briefly engaged in the business of metal printing. Under Dnyaneshwar, the company launched a brandy in partnership with Camus Cognac. In 1988, the company shifted to being a cooperative. By 1989, the syndicate was considered a leading manufacturer of alcohol in the country.

In 1990, Dnyaneshwar took over as chairman of the board of directors for the syndicate upon the death of S. L. Limaye, a position he would serve until his death in January 2009. In 1991, a test plant developed from research funded by the United States Agency for International Development was installed at the syndicate which controlled pollution during the manufacturing of industrial alcohol. That same year, Dnyaneshwar's son Mandar Agashe joined the syndicate's board of directors, going on to become a joint managing director with his father by 1994. Dnyaneshwar's younger son, Ashutosh Agashe, was appointed to the board of directors in 1996.

By 1998, the syndicate began marketing ayurvedic medicines, health care products, and bulk raw materials. It was also been involved in the manufacturing of food products and veterinary medicine. That same year, the syndicate hosted cricket tournaments in Pune. In 1999, Mandar resigned as joint managing director, going on to found the syndicate's sister company Brihans Natural Products Ltd. in 2000. The syndicate began promoting ayurvedic skincare products made by its sister company, Brihans Natural Products Ltd. That same year, Ashutosh was appointed as joint managing director. 

By 2002, the syndicate also manufactured alcohol-based chemicals. In 2005, the syndicate entered a partnership with Howling Wolves Wine Group of Australia which planned to set up a wine production base in India. The partnership was made with Baumgarten & Walia Ltd., a wholly owned subsidiary of the syndicate. That same year, Radico Khaitan signed an agreement with the syndicate for acquisition of their liquor brands Brihans Napoleon Brandy, Brihans Premium Whisky, Brihans Grape Brandy, Tropicana White Rum, Calcutta Dry Gin, Lord Nelson Rum and Red Russian Vodka in line with their domestic growth plan.

Under Ashutosh Agashe: 2009 — present 
In 2009, upon Dnyaneshwar Agashe's death, Ashutosh Agashe was appointed chairman and managing director of the syndicate. In 2013, the syndicate sold its liquor manufacturing arm to Radico Khaitan. In 2014, the syndicate was involved in the Brihan Karan Sugar Syndicate Private Limited (BKSSPL) trademark 'Tango' scandal. In May 2021, during the COVID-19 pandemic in India, Ashutosh and the syndicate donated oxygen concentrators to hospitals in Shreepur, Maharashtra.

References

Bibliography 

 

Indian brands
Sugar companies of India
Companies based in Pune
Food and drink companies established in 1934
Privately held companies
Indian companies established in 1934